"What Was I Drinking" is a song co-written and recorded by Canadian country artist Tebey. He co-wrote the track with Danick Dupelle and Jimmy Thow, and co-produced it with Dupelle. It is the lead single off Tebey's upcoming album Tulum.

Background
Tebey wrote the song with his frequent collaborators Jimmy Thow and Danick Dupelle while in Mexico, with the title "What Was I Drinking" being partly inspired by a night out the three had during the trip. The three went out for several drinks one night and subsequently all woke up feeling "violently ill", with Thow remarking to Tebey "what were we drinking". Tebey stated that the track sounded more like country music than his recent contemporary-influenced singles. The track was released ahead of his appearance at the 2022 C2C: Country to Country festival in the United Kingdom.

Critical reception
Top Country named the song their "Pick of the Week" for February 18, 2022, citing it as the "perfect song to get you in the mood" for the Family Day long weekend.

Accolades

Commercial performance
"What Was I Drinking" has reached a peak of number 18 on the Billboard Canada Country chart. It debuted as the most added song at all formats of Canadian radio according to Mediabase, ahead of Ed Sheeran's The Joker and the Queen.

Music video
The official lyric video for "What Was I Drinking" was directed by Brent Hallman and premiered on April 7, 2020. It features an animated stick figure of Tebey acting out the story of the song. Tebey also released an acoustic performance video on April 28, 2022. It was recorded in Nashville and features him on vocals alongside Danick Dupelle, Mike Melancon, and Stephan LaPlante as a supporting band.

Charts

References

2022 songs
2022 singles
Tebey songs
Songs written by Tebey
Songs written by Danick Dupelle
Song recordings produced by Danick Dupelle